Giovanni Ruvolo (born 8 May 1966 in Caltanissetta) is an Italian biologist and politician.

He ran for Mayor of Caltanissetta as an independent at the 2014 Italian local elections and he was elected on 11 June 2014.

See also
2014 Italian local elections
List of mayors of Caltanissetta

References

External links
 

1966 births
Living people
Mayors of Caltanissetta